The debut is a traditional Filipino coming-of-age celebration which celebrates a young woman's 18th birthday, the age of maturity in the Philippines. Although also reaching legal maturity at 18, a Filipino man may mark his own debut on his 21st birthday, albeit with less formal celebrations or none at all.

Description
On her 18th birthday, a Filipino girl customarily throws a large party, similar to quinceañera or sweet sixteen, complete with her own hand-picked entourage of 18 individuals or multiple sets of 18. In most cases, the debutante may choose 18 roses and 18 candles if she wishes to. The sole purpose of the roses is to honor the closest male to the celebrant. This includes uncles, cousins, close friends, suitors or boyfriend. Most debut celebrations prefer the number of people participating add up to 18. This is why they keep it to 18 roses and 18 candles. The celebrant's court usually wears a formal dress, such as the Barong Tagalog or the western black tie.

Program
A typical ceremony begins with a short prayer invoking blessings upon the debutante. She then enters, and performs traditional dances with her court for their guests. The most important one is known as the "Grand Cotillion Dance", usually a waltz.

An "18 Roses Dance" or "9 Roses Dance" is also done, in which 18 or 9 males of the debutante's choice dance with her after presenting her with a single red rose or her favorite flower. This dance is almost always preceded or concluded with a "Father and Daughter Dance", and sometimes the father takes the place of the 18th or 9th rose (who is often the girl's significant other). An older male relative, such as a grandfather, may take the father's place if the latter is unavailable or deceased.

The debutante also has 18 or 9 "candles", presented by female friends or relations. Each delivers a short speech about her relationship with the celebrant and any special greeting, and lights a candle that is either in her hand or placed in a stand.

Music and other performances are usually interspersed between the "18 items" "9 items" rites, while dinner and sometimes alcohol are served. A birthday cake ceremony often occurs, and a fireworks display may conclude more extravagant parties. The night ends with the debutante's speech, in which she shares her thoughts on life and extends her gratitude towards her guests.

Other "18 or 9 items"
Recent additions to the ceremony are the "18 Treasures", in which 18 individuals (male or female) each present the debutante with a gift. These usually also involve a speech from each individual, but unlike the Roses and Candles sets, these groups are of mixed gender.

Others involve material presents for the debutante, such as the 18 shoes and the 18 bills. A "blue bill" in the context of this ceremony refers to the Philippine one thousand peso note, which is blue.

Lastly, there are the (optional) 18 white roses. If the debutante is missing a figure in her life such as a father, she chooses her 18 white roses in place of that figure.

In film
The custom was highlighted in the 2001 American small-budget film The Debut, starring Dante Basco.

References

External links
Philippine Debut Directory

Birthdays
Philippine traditions
Rites of passage